Government Inter College Barabanki or GIC-Barabanki is one of the oldest middle schools of Barabanki city, Uttar Pradesh, India. It was established in 1883.

GIC-Barabanki is governed by Uttar Pradesh Board of High School and Intermediate Education, Allahabad.

Famous staff members
 Maudid Ali, Ex Principal

Famous alumni
 K. D. Singh

References 

Boys' schools in India
Intermediate colleges in Uttar Pradesh
Schools in Barabanki, Uttar Pradesh
Educational institutions established in 1883
1883 establishments in India